Journey to the Center of Your Wallet is the second full-length album written and performed by the Humpers.

Track listing
  "This Measly Dimension"
  "Freak Magnet"
  "You Give Good Headache"
  "Watching You, (I'm)"
  "Space Station Love"
  "Bombs Away"
  "Dope on a Rope"
  "Dead Last"
  "Blow"
  "Do the Wrong Thing"
  "Crank Call"
  "Up Yer Heart"
  "Motorhead"

1995 albums
The Humpers albums